Chembarambakkam lake is a lake located in Chennai, Tamil Nadu, India, about 25 km from Chennai. It is one of the two rain-fed reservoirs from where water is drawn for supply to Chennai City, the other one being the Puzhal Lake. The Adyar River originates from this lake. A part of water supply of the metropolis of Chennai is drawn from this lake. This was the first Artificial lake built by Rajendra Chola I the son of Rajaraja Chola and Thiripuvana Madeviyar, prince of Kodumbalur.

During Chennai's water crisis of 2019, Chembarambakkam Lake dried up.

The lake
Chembarambakkam lake was known as Puliyur Kottam. It is one of the 24  (villages) that existed even during the later Chola period in Thondai Mandalam which had Kanchipuram as its headquarters. The lake was built by Rajendra Chola, the son of Rajaraja Chola.

The full capacity of the lake is 3,645 million ft3 (108 million m3).

However, acute sedimentation has eaten more than 40% of its water holding capacity. There is an ancient Shiva temple and Kanni Koil located here.

Pipelines
There are two pipelines existing from the lake's water treatment plant. The existing pipeline on Poonamallee Bypass Road has the capacity to convey only half of the 530 million litres that can be treated at the plant. In 2012, Chennai Metrowater started evaluating the feasibility of laying a third pipeline with a diameter of about 2,000 mm from the Chembarambakkam water treatment plant at a cost of  650million, which will run parallel to the existing one for over 6.5 km.

Gallery

See also

 Puzhal lake
 Water management in Chennai
 Birding in Chennai

References

Lakes of Chennai
Reservoirs in Tamil Nadu